The  kata are a series of five empty hand forms taught in many karate styles.  The Pinan kata originated in Okinawa and were adapted by Anko Itosu from older kata such as Kusanku and Channan into forms suitable for teaching karate to young students. Pinan is the Chinese Pinyin notation of 平安; when Gichin Funakoshi brought karate to Japan, he spelt the kata name as Heian, which is the onyomi of 平安. Pinan or Heian means "peaceful and safe". Korean Tang Soo Do, one of 5 original kwan of Korea, also practice these kata; they are termed, "Pyong-an" or "Pyung-Ahn", which is a Korean pronunciation of the term "ping-an".

History
The Pinan kata were introduced into the school systems on Okinawa in 1895, and were subsequently adopted by many teachers and schools in the 1900s. Thus, they are present today in the curriculum of Shitō-ryū, Wadō-ryū, Shōrin-ryū, Kobayashi-ryū, Kyokushin, Seido Juku, Shinki-Ryu, Shōrei-ryū, Shotojuku, Shotokan, Matsubayashi-ryū, Shukokai, Shindo Jinen Ryu, Kosho-ryū Kempo, Kenyu Ryu, Kushin Ryu and several other styles.

One of the stories surrounding the history of the Pingan kata claims that Itosu learned a kata from a Chinese man living in Okinawa. This kata was called "Chiang Nan" by the Chinese man. The form became known as "Channan", an Okinawan/Japanese approximation of the Chinese pronunciation. The original form of the Channan kata is lost.
Itosu formed 5 katas from the long Channan Kata which he thought would be easier to learn. Funakoshi modified the Pinan forms to Heian forms, introducing his version of Kushanku (actually renamed Kanku Dai). The 5 kata were Pinans Shodan, Nidan, Sandan, Yondan, and Godan.

Current practice

The Pinans are taught to various beginner ranks according to their difficulty.  The kata are all loosely based on an I-shaped embusen or shape.  These kata serve as the foundation to many of the advanced kata within Karate, as many of the techniques contained in these kata are contained in the higher grade katas as well, especially Kusanku.

In certain styles, Pinan Shodan and Pinan Nidan are inverted - what certain styles call Pinan Shodan is what others call Heian Nidan, and vice versa. For example, the kata Shotokan calls Heian Shodan, other styles, such as Shitō-ryū call Pinan Nidan. Another point to note is that Shūkōkai teaches Pinan Nidan first, and Pinan Shodan second, believing Pinan Nidan to be the easier, more beginner-friendly kata. The order that is learnt in Wado-Ryu goes as follows,
Pinan Nidan,
Pinan Shodan,
Pinan Sandan,
Pinan Yondan (also called Pinan Shidan) and
Pinan Godan.
In some Shito-Ryu dojos the order is different, as most Shito Ryu versions of Pinan Shodan are harder than the rest, so the order is as follows,
Pinan Nidan
Pinan Sandan
Pinan Yondan (also called Pinan Shidan)
Pinan Godan
Pinan Shodan

See also
 Karate kata
 Kata
 Taikyoku - The simplified versions of the pinan/heian kata.

References

External links
 History of the Pinan Series and Explanation of Pinan Shodan (Shorin-ryū)

Karate kata